ASPS may refer to:

 Advanced sleep phase syndrome, a sleep disorder in which patients feel very sleepy early in the evening
 American Society of Plastic Surgeons, the largest plastic surgery specialty organization in the world
 Alveolar soft part sarcoma, a rare type of soft tissue sarcoma tumor
 Association of Scottish Police Superintendents
 Albino Squirrel Preservation Society, an organization dedicated to the preservation of albino squirrels

See also
 Asp (disambiguation), for the singular of Asps
 ASP (disambiguation), for the singular of ASPs